is a Japanese psychologist and critic. He specializes in the psychiatry of puberty and adolescence.
Saitō is Director of Medical Service at Sofukai Sasaki Hospital in Funabashi, Chiba.

Saitō is notable for his study of hikikomori, a term he coined; he is internationally recognized as Japan's leading hikikomori expert.

Personal history
Saito was born in Kitakami, Iwate. In 1980 he graduated from Morioka First High School and matriculated into the University of Tsukuba the same year; graduating in 1986 from the medical faculty with a specialization in Environmental Ecology. In 1990 he completed a doctoral course in medicine under the leadership of Hiroshi Inamura.

Publications 
 Bunmyakubyō--Lacan/Bateson/Maturana (文脈病――ラカン/ベイトソン/マトゥラーナ), Context disease--Lacan/Bateson/Maturana 1998
 Shakaiteki hikikomori--Owaranai Shishunki (社会的ひきこもり――終わらない思春期),  Social withdrawal--Adolescence without End 1998
 Sento bishojo no seishinbunseki (戦闘美少女の精神分析), Psychoanalysis of Beautiful Fighting Girl 2000
 Gekiron! hikikomori (激論！ひきこもり), Argument! hikikomori (co-authored with Sadatsugu Kudo) 2001
  'Hikikomori' kyushutu manual (「ひきこもり」救出マニュアル),  'Hikikomori' rescue manual  2002
 OK? Hikikomori OK! (OK?ひきこもりOK!), OK? Hikikomori OK! 2003
 Hikikomori bunkaron (ひきこもり文化論), On Hikikomori culture 2003
 Kairi no pop skill (乖離のポップ・スキル), Pop skill of Dissociation 2004
 Bungaku no choukou (文学の徴候), Symptom of the literature 2004
 Ikinobiru tame no Lacan (生き延びるためのラカン), Lacan for survival 2006
 Media ha sonzai shinai (メディアは存在しない), Media does not exist 2007
 Artist wa kyokaisenjou de odoru (アーティストは境界線上で踊る), Artists dance on the borderline 2007
 Bungaku no dansou--Sekai/Shinsai/Character (文学の断層――セカイ・震災・キャラクター) Dislocation of the literature--Sekai/Disaster/Character 2008
 Kankei no kagaku toshite no bungaku (関係の化学としての文学), Literature as chemistry of relationships 2009
 Bungaku no seishinbunseki (「文学」の精神分析), Psychoanalysis of 'Literature'  2009
 Hikikomori kara mita mirai--SIGN OF THE TIMES 2005−2010 (ひきこもりから見た未来――SIGN OF THE TIMES 2005−2010) The future seen from hikikomori--SIGN OF THE TIMES 2005−2010 2010
 Character seishinbunseki (キャラクター精神分析) Character psychoanalysis 2011

Translation in English

 Saitō, Tamaki (2007) "Otaku Sexuality" in Christopher Bolton, Istvan Csicsery-Ronay Jr., and Takayuki Tatsumi ed., Robot Ghosts and Wired Dreams. Minneapolis: University of Minnesota Press.  (with a foreword by Mari Kotani)
Saitō, Tamaki (2009) "The Asymmetry of Masculine/ Feminine Otaku Sexuality: Moe, Yaoi and Phallic Girls" in Ayelet Zohar, ed., Postgender: Gender, Sexuality and Performativity in Japanese Culture. Newcastle upon Tyne: Cambridge Scholars Publishing. .
 Saitō, Tamaki (2011) Beautiful Fighting Girl. Trans. J. Keith Vincent and Dawn Lawson. Minneapolis: University Of Minnesota Press.  (with a foreword by Hiroki Azuma)
 Saitō, Tamaki (2012) Social Withdrawal: Adolescence without End. Trans. Jeffrey Angles. Minneapolis: University of Minnesota Press.

References

External links 

 Researcher Information Page TRIOS of University of Tsukuba
 Department of Social Psychiatry and Mental Health, Faculty of Medicine, University of Tsukuba 
 Tamaki Saitō's website 
 Sofukai Sasaki Hospital website 

Anime and manga critics
Japanese psychologists
Japanese psychiatrists
Living people
1961 births
Comics scholars